Tim's Cascade Snacks, a subsidiary of Utz Brands, is a manufacturer of potato chips and popcorn. The brands include Tim's Cascade Style Potato Chips, Hawaiian Brand Kettle Chips, and Erin's Gourmet Popcorn.

History 
The company was founded in 1986 by Tim Kennedy and the production facilities are located in the U.S. state of Washington. The founder, Tim Kennedy, started the company using only 100% peanut oil to cook the chips. Although listing on the back of the bag that they use an "old family recipe" after being acquired by Pinnacle Foods, the factory switched to substituting cheaper oils and lists corn oil and sunflower oil as some alternatives. Tim no longer states that they cook their product in small batches anymore either. In 2019, it was acquired by Utz Brand.

Products 
Tim's potato chips, packaged in red-and-white-striped bags, are kettle-cooked in small batches. Potato chip sales are most prominent in the Pacific Northwest, but are also distributed throughout the United States and in some parts of Asia.

Aficionados of the brand still lament the removal of the popular Cajun flavor, a spicy barbecue style, less overtly spicy than the Jalapeño and with none of the smoke present in the Alder Smoke Barbecue. The company still occasionally makes these flavors available as limited releases in regional markets.

References

External links 
 

Brand name snack foods
Companies based in King County, Washington
Pinnacle Foods brands
Brand name potato chips and crisps
Snack food manufacturers of the United States
Food and drink companies established in 1986
1986 establishments in Washington (state)